Ismael Al-Harbi (Arabic:إسماعيل الحربي) (born 14 November 1998) is an Emirati footballer who plays for Al-Arabi as a right back.

Career

Al-Wahda
Al-Harbi started his career at Al-Wahda and is a product of the Al-Wahda's youth system. On 1 January 2020, Al-Harbi made his professional debut for Al-Wahda against Al-Sharjah in the Pro League, replacing Mansoor Al-Harbi .

References

External links
 

1998 births
Living people
Emirati footballers
Al Wahda FC players
Al-Arabi SC (UAE) players
UAE Pro League players
UAE First Division League players
Association football fullbacks
Place of birth missing (living people)